The Kerbal Formation is a geologic formation in Ohio. It dates back to the Cambrian.

References
 Generalized Stratigraphic Chart for Ohio

Cambrian Ohio